Nidhi Ashok Buley (born 14 August 1986) is an Indian cricketer who currently plays for Jharkhand. She plays as a slow left-arm orthodox bowler. She appeared in one Test match and one One Day International for India in 2006, on India's tour of England and Ireland. She previously played domestic cricket for Madhya Pradesh.

References

External links
 
 

1986 births
Living people
Cricketers from Indore
Indian women cricketers
India women Test cricketers
India women One Day International cricketers
Madhya Pradesh women cricketers
Jharkhand women cricketers
Central Zone women cricketers
21st-century Indian women
21st-century Indian people